Moroccan War may refer to:

 Franco-Moroccan War of 1844, between France and Morocco
 Hispano-Moroccan War (1859–60), between Spain and Morocco
 Rif War also known as the Second Moroccan War, 1921–1926, between Spain, France and Northern Morocco (Republic of the Rif)

Others
 List of Spanish colonial wars in Morocco
 Franco-Moroccan War (disambiguation)
 Sand War, 1963, between Algeria and Morocco
 Western Sahara War, 1975–1991, between Morocco and the indigenous Sahrawi Polisario Front

See also
 Moroccan–Portuguese conflicts
 Military history of Morocco
 Western Sahara conflict